The Monson Motor Lodge, at 32 Avenida Menendez, Saint Augustine, Florida, was in 1964 the site of a landmark protest event of the Civil Rights Movement. The site was before that occupied by the Monson House, a 19th-century boarding house.

The Monson House 

The original Monson hotel was established by Captain Anthony Vincent "Bossy" Monson and his wife Florence Young in the 1880s, not long before the opening of the Flagler hotels made the city a luxury destination.  Monson was a Saint Augustine native raised at 56 Marine Street (now known as the González-Jones House). Born in 1854, he was the youngest of eight children, including William F Monson, who became a notable architect/builder in Mandarin, Florida. His mother was Laurenna Leonardy, a Minorcan descendant of the Bonelly and Leonardy families who were original colonists in Andrew Turnbull's expedition at New Smyrna, Florida. Leonardy married William Monson (Anton Bengt Osmundsen), who had immigrated to America in 1836 from Stavanger, Norway.

The first Monson House was on the water's edge at 24 Bay Street (now Avenida Menendez), between the Plaza and Fort Marion. An 1885 advertisement claimed rooms for ten boarders at $9-$10/week. In addition to rented rooms, the Monson offered tourists a chance to sail to the Saint Augustine Lighthouse on Anastasia Island on one of four yachts anchored near the club house.

The visitor to St. Augustine should consider the sojourn incomplete without a sail in the harbor and over in the beach where one can climb the stairs to the top of the light-house on Anastasia Island, and get a magnificent view of the ocean on one side and the town on the other. In order to do this, it will be necessary to engage one of Captain Monson's yachts, Mamie, Maria, Traveller or Ocrenba. which are at anchor near the club-house. Captain Monson is a native of St. Augustine and about 58 years of age. He is also proprietor of a boarding house which can accommodate ten guests at $1.50 per day from $9 to $10 per week.

This first house burned in an 1895 fire. The second Monson House was located at 26 Bay Street next to Brava Lane. Open all year, the rates were $1.50 to $2.00 per day with $7.00 to 12.00 per week. Residents could enjoy hot and cold baths. The hotel was again enlarged in 1901 and in 1912, when the capacity was advertised at 75.

The final wooden hotel fell victim to the April 1914 fire that started at the Florida House and destroyed everything from Saint George Street to the Bay. The fire claimed four hotels, the opera house, the courthouse, and countless homes and businesses.  The Monson was replaced by a masonry structure that opened on January 5, 1915. Monson died later that year, and his brother-in-law Charles E Young Sr became manager of the new hotel.

The Monson was enlarged in 1916 with an addition to the south side that almost doubled its size. The Monson Hotel remained a fixture on Saint Augustine's bay front until 1960, when it was demolished and replaced by the Monson Motor Lodge. That structure was eventually razed as well, and in 2003 reopened as the Hilton Bayfront Hotel. It remains under Hilton's management today, with 72 rooms spread over 19 small buildings. During excavations prior to construction of the Hilton's underground parking garage, archeologists found evidence of colonial foundations from Saint Augustine's British Period (1763–1784).

Civil Rights Movement 

In the spring of 1964, Robert Hayling worked with the Southern Christian Leadership Conference to recruit college students to come to Saint Augustine for spring break to take part in civil rights activities.  Martin Luther King Jr. of the SCLC was arrested on the steps of the Monson Motor Lodge restaurant, June 11, 1964. He wrote a "Letter from the Saint Augustine Jail" to his friend, Israel S. Dresner, in New Jersey, encouraging rabbis to come to Saint Augustine and take part in the movement. The result was the largest mass arrest of rabbis in American history, which occurred June 18 at the Monson. That same day, black and white activists jumped into the Monson swimming pool in defiance of segregation ordinances. The manager of the hotel, James Brock, responded by pouring muriatic acid into the water to drive the "wade in" protestors out. Photographs of this action, and of a police officer jumping into the pool to arrest the young activists, were broadcast around the world and became some of the most famous images of the movement. On June 30, Florida Governor Farris Bryant announced the formation of a biracial committee to restore interracial communication in Saint Augustine. National SCLC leaders left Saint Augustine on July 1, the day before President Lyndon Johnson signed the Civil Rights Act into law.

The motel and pool were demolished in March 2003, despite five years of protests, thus eliminating one of the nation's important landmarks of the civil rights movement.  The Hilton Bayfront Hotel was built on the site. Today, the steps of the Monson Motor Lodge have been preserved with a plaque to commemorate King's activism in the city. The last sign from the Monson is preserved in the ACCORD Civil Rights Museum at 79 Bridge Street, the former dental office of Dr. Robert Hayling, the leader of the civil rights movement in St. Augustine. It has also been displayed at the state Capitol in Tallahassee.

References 

Civil rights movement
St. Augustine, Florida
1964 in Florida
African-American history of Florida
Buildings and structures in St. Johns County, Florida
Riots and civil disorder in Florida
Demolished buildings and structures in Florida
Buildings and structures demolished in 2003
Buildings and structures demolished in 1960